Berta M. Geller is an American research professor emeritus in the department of family medicine at the University of Vermont College of Medicine. She was a long time faculty member in its health promotion office.

Life

Geller completed a Ed.D. at the University of Vermont. Her 1992 dissertation was titled Eighth grade students' smoking behavior in relationship to their teachers', favorite teachers' and principals' smoking behavior.

In February 1992, Geller, a faculty member in the University of Vermont's health promotion office, was a speaker in a breast cancer forum hosted by the Burlington Board of Health and the Burlington Women's Council. In 2000, Geller was a faculty member of the University of Vermont College of Medicine (UVCM). She worked as a research associate and professor in breast cancer studies. In 2007, Geller was the principal investigator on a $213,500 scholar grant from the American Cancer Society. The grant is to improve skills for radiologists reading mammograms. She was named the 2008 J. Walter Juckett Scholar for her project aimed at providing social support to cancer survivors.

In 2021, Geller was the West Tisbury, Massachusetts Complete Streets committee chair.

References

Citations

Bibliography 

Living people
Date of birth missing (living people)
Place of birth missing (living people)
20th-century American women scientists
21st-century American women scientists
University of Vermont alumni
University of Vermont faculty
Cancer researchers
American medical researchers
Women medical researchers
Year of birth missing (living people)